In mathematics, Gegenbauer polynomials or ultraspherical polynomials C(x) are  orthogonal polynomials on the interval [−1,1] with respect to the weight function (1 − x2)α–1/2. They generalize Legendre polynomials and Chebyshev polynomials, and are special cases of Jacobi polynomials. They are named after Leopold Gegenbauer.

Characterizations

A variety of characterizations of the Gegenbauer polynomials are available.

 The polynomials can be defined in terms of their generating function :

 The polynomials satisfy the recurrence relation :

 Gegenbauer polynomials are particular solutions of the Gegenbauer differential equation :

When α = 1/2, the equation reduces to the Legendre equation, and the Gegenbauer polynomials reduce to the Legendre polynomials.
When α = 1, the equation reduces to the Chebyshev differential equation, and the Gegenbauer polynomials reduce to the Chebyshev polynomials of the second kind.

 They are given as Gaussian hypergeometric series in certain cases where the series is in fact finite:

(Abramowitz & Stegun p. 561). Here (2α)n is the rising factorial.   Explicitly,

 They are special cases of the Jacobi polynomials :

One therefore also has the Rodrigues formula

Orthogonality and normalization

For a fixed α, the polynomials are orthogonal on [−1, 1] with respect to the weighting function (Abramowitz & Stegun p. 774)

To wit, for n ≠ m,

They are normalized by

Applications
The Gegenbauer polynomials appear naturally as extensions of Legendre polynomials in the context of potential theory and harmonic analysis.  The Newtonian potential in Rn has the expansion, valid with α = (n − 2)/2,

When n = 3, this gives the Legendre polynomial expansion of the gravitational potential.  Similar expressions are available for the expansion of the Poisson kernel in a ball .

It follows that the quantities  are spherical harmonics, when regarded as a function of x only.  They are, in fact, exactly the zonal spherical harmonics, up to a normalizing constant.

Gegenbauer polynomials also appear in the theory of Positive-definite functions.

The Askey–Gasper inequality reads

In spectral methods for solving differential equations, if a function is expanded in the basis of Chebyshev polynomials and its derivative is represented in a Gegenbauer/ultraspherical basis, then the derivative operator becomes a diagonal matrix, leading to fast banded matrix methods for large problems.

See also

 Rogers polynomials, the q-analogue of Gegenbauer polynomials
 Chebyshev polynomials
 Romanovski polynomials

References 

 *
 .
 .

Specific

Orthogonal polynomials
Special hypergeometric functions